Smith Hill is a mountain located in Central New York Region of New York located northeast of Utica, New York. Smith Hill is the location of the WKTV and the WUTR broadcast antennas.

References

Mountains of Oneida County, New York
Mountains of New York (state)